Greeley is a city in Delaware County, Iowa, United States. The population was 217 at the time of the 2020 census.

History
Greeley was platted in 1855 and was named after Horace Greeley. The town of Greeley experienced growth in the 1870s when the Davenport and St. Paul Railroad was built through the settlement.

Geography
Greeley's longitude and latitude coordinatesin decimal form are 42.585115, -91.341725.

Demographics

2010 census
As of the census of 2010, there were 256 people, 101 households, and 71 families residing in the city. The racial makeup of the city was 100.0% White.

There were 101 households, of which 28.7% had children under the age of 18 living with them, 51.5% were married couples living together, 14.9% had a female householder with no husband present, 4.0% had a male householder with no wife present, and 29.7% were non-families. 17.8% of all households were made up of individuals, and 7% had someone living alone who was 65 years of age or older. The average household size was 2.53 and the average family size was 2.89.

The median age in the city was 40 years. 21.9% of residents were under the age of 18; 11.7% were between the ages of 18 and 24; 22.7% were from 25 to 44; 29.3% were from 45 to 64; and 14.5% were 65 years of age or older. The gender makeup of the city was 44.5% male and 55.5% female.

2000 census
As of the census of 2000, there were 276 people, 112 households, and 84 families residing in the city. The racial makeup of the city was 100.00% White. Hispanic or Latino of any race were 0.36% of the population.

There were 112 households, out of which 26.8% had children under the age of 18 living with them, 58.0% were married couples living together, 11.6% had a female householder with no husband present, and 25.0% were non-families. 23.2% of all households were made up of individuals, and 13.4% had someone living alone who was 65 years of age or older. The average household size was 2.46 and the average family size was 2.86.

In the city, the population was spread out, with 22.1% under the age of 18, 8.0% from 18 to 24, 27.2% from 25 to 44, 26.8% from 45 to 64, and 15.9% who were 65 years of age or older. The median age was 41 years. For every 100 females, there were 90.3 males. For every 100 females age 18 and over, there were 92.0 males.

The median income for a household in the city was $35,000, and the median income for a family was $41,250. Males had a median income of $28,750 versus $19,500 for females. The per capita income for the city was $15,508. About 9.1% of families and 10.2% of the population were below the poverty line, including 15.6% of those under the age of eighteen and 4.8% of those 65 or over.

Education
The West Delaware County Community School District operates local area public schools.

Windfarm

Located primarily to the west of Greeley, a 41 Megawatt (MW) windfarm was constructed in 2011. Central Iowa Power Cooperative is purchasing the power generated by the project under a 20-year power purchase agreement and is distributing the power to its member Cooperatives.

References

External links

 
City-Data Comprehensive Statistical Data and more about Greeley

Cities in Iowa
Cities in Delaware County, Iowa
1855 establishments in Iowa
Populated places established in 1855